Hammersmith Broadway is a major transport node and shopping centre in Hammersmith, London.

History  
The shopping centre opened in 1994, on the site of many now-demolished buildings, including The Clarendon Hotel (a music venue) and Palmers Department Store. The complex was designed by EPR Architects.

Tenants 
Current tenants include Auntie Anne's, Ben's Cookies, Betfred, Boots, Cards Galore, Costa Coffee, Hays plc, Hotel Chocolat, Krispy Kreme, Leon, McDonald's, Paperchase, Pret a Manger, Pure, Scribbler, Starbucks, Supercuts, Superdrug, Tesco, The Body Shop, Timpson and Wasabi.

Transport 
The complex includes a large, modern bus station, spread across two levels. The upper bus station is located directly above the shopping centre, whereas the lower bus station is located at ground level adjacent to the centre.

It is also served by two London Underground stations named Hammersmith: The District and Piccadilly lines station is located directly below the shopping centre, with entrances at either end of the centre, while the Circle and Hammersmith & City lines station is located a short distance north of the centre at Beadon Road.

Gallery

References

External links 

 

Hammersmith
Shopping centres in the London Borough of Hammersmith and Fulham
Shopping malls established in 1994
1994 establishments in England